To Be Immortal is the third album released by Oran "Juice" Jones. It was released in 1989 through Def Jam Recordings and was his final album with the label. The album proved be an even bigger commercial failure than his previous album, not making it to any Billboard charts. Jones left the music business shortly after the album.

Track listing
"Money, Honey"      
"Pipe Dreams"     
"Gangster Attitude"      
"Never Say Goodbye"      
"To Be Immortal"      
"Dollar and a Dream"      
"Sacrifices"      
"Shaniqua"      
"Street Style"      
"Time"

Trivia
 Oran "Juice" Jones' "Ow!" at the beginning of "Shaniqua" would later be sampled on Black Box's hit single "Everybody Everybody".

References

1989 albums
Def Jam Recordings albums
Oran "Juice" Jones albums